Kopanica may refer to:

Places 
Germany
 Köpenick, Berlin
 Duchy of Kopanica, a former polity based in Köpenick

North Macedonia
 Kopanica, Saraj

Poland
 Kopanica, Gmina Nowinka in Podlaskie Voivodeship
 Kopanica, Gmina Płaska in Podlaskie Voivodeship
 Kopanica, Greater Poland Voivodeship
 Kopanica, West Pomeranian Voivodeship

Other uses 
 Kopanitsa, a Balkan folk dance